Bożena Wojtkowska-Haracz (born 28 October 1962) is a Polish badminton player. She competed in women's doubles at the 1992 Summer Olympics in Barcelona.

References

External links

1962 births
Living people
Polish female badminton players
Olympic badminton players of Poland
Badminton players at the 1992 Summer Olympics
People from Głubczyce